Yu-Chen Wang (born 1978 in Taichung Taiwan) is a British-Taiwanese artist and curator. She is based in London, UK, working internationally.

Education 
Yu-Chen Wang graduated with an MA in Fine Art from Chelsea College of Art in London in 2002. She previously attended the Postgraduate Study programme at Goldsmiths College University of London.

Practice 

Wang states that her practice "very much focuses on research and process, experience and relationship. There’s a particular way for developing my work, which often involves a period of time spent in a specific place. I would then undertake extensive research the contextual histories and engage with a group of locally-based people or specialists who would assist my research. Two major components I’d like to explore generally: the archives and archaeology, which form the main source of inspiration for developing my work."

In conjunction with her residency at the Centre for Chinese Contemporary Art in Manchester, Yu-Chen Wang created a multimedia project at the Victoria Baths. The Splash and a Last Drop, based on a short science fiction story, A Last Drop, by Bob Dickinson, included a series of drawings, sculptures, and a film about an immersive live performance that took place in 2011 in one of the empty Edwardian public baths and in the more futuristic setting of the polished metal Turkish baths.

In 2018, Wang received the Honorary Mention Collide Award, a partnership programme between Arts at CERN and FACT Liverpool. A group of artists were invited to reside at CERN (European Organisation for Nuclear Research, Geneva) to advance their artistic practice by establishing a dialogue with engineers and particle physicists. The resulting 12 artworks by 11 international artists were first shown at FACT Liverpool in 2018 under the title Broken Symmetries, the exhibition then toured internationally. Wang's contribution was her project We aren't able to prove that just yet, but we know it's out there, where she combined images and references from both personal and institutional archives with interviews with scientists into a poetic narrative. By giving a voice to CERN’s unsung multitudes, its technicians, analysts and engineers, she explores the human scale of the CERN project.

Her recent project Full circle, an immersive cinematic video installation with sound design by Kristian Craig Robinson aka Capitol K, was commissioned by Doncaster Creates. Wang explores Doncaster’s industrial heritage and looks once again at the collision of nature and technology. The video was subsequently touring with screenings at The Lindholme Hall Estate in the Hatfield Moors and the Potteric Carr Nature Reserve as part of ArtBomb 2022.

During her artist- residency at Metal, Peterborough in 2022, Wang will research the history of draining the Fens with a particular interest in the interaction between historic and natural environments. Also in 2022, Wang adapted her installation If there is a place I haven't been to from 2020, originally commissioned by the Cube Project Space at Moca Taipei, for the exhibition L’œil du cyclone (Eye of the Storm) at Le Lieu Unique in Nantes.

Her exhibitions are sometimes also accompanied by dinner or breakfast events, hosted by the artist, like the cross-cultural Pān-toh Supra at Contemporary Art Space in Batumi and at Tbilisi Triennial in Georgia, two of many collaborations with her partner, the British-Georgian artist Andro Semeiko. Other collaborations include an installation with their daughter Lily for the show My Kid Could’ve Done That! at Edge Art Centre in Bath, curated by Will Cooper and his daughter.

In her role as a curator, Wang was running the art space Basement Art Project in central London for many years . She curated Happy End at Yinka Shonibare's space Guest Projects in London featuring works by artists Andro Semeiko, Alasdair Duncan, Pil and Galia Kollectiv, Ad de Jong, Sheena Macrae, Andrew Darke, Lakis and Aris Ionas, Sebastian Lowsley-Williams and Tomoko Takahashi, including performances by Tom Eykelhof and Lesley Cook and a film programme curated by Georgia Korossi.

Awards and residencies 
In 2023, Wang was selected to undertake a virtual practice-based research residency as part of the 3-year AHRC funded research project Transforming Collections: Reimagining Art, Nation and Heritage, led by Dr Susan Pui San Lok, UAL Professor of Contemporary Art and Director of the Decolonising Arts Institute. The commissioned work will feature in a major public programme in collaboration with Tate Learning in autumn 2024.

Earlier residencies and awards:
2011: Breathe residency at Chinese Centre for Contemporary Art Manchester
2016/17: Annotations Outset Study Commissions
2018: CERN Honorary Mention Collide International / New Art Commission
2018: Junction Works residency at Grand Union
2022: Residency at Metal, Peterborough, Chauffeur's Cottage

Teaching 
Yu-Chen Wang is Associate Lecturer in BA Drawing at Camberwell College / University of Arts London and at the BA Fine Art programme at Goldsmiths College University of London. She has given lectures and talks at Liverpool John Moore University, University of Lancaster, National Taipei University of Education, University for the Creative Arts Canterbury, National Cheng Kung University inTainan, Wimbledon College of Arts London; College of Arts of the University of Lincoln, Lasalle College of the Arts in Singapore.

Exhibitions 

 2011: The Splash and A Last Drop, performance, FutureEverything at Victoria Baths, Manchester
2011: Cornerhouse, Manchester
2012: Hayward Gallery, London
 2014: Taipei Biennial
2014: Yu-Chen Wang & Nicholas Vaughan, Hundred Years Gallery London
 2014: This is the end..., Taipei Biennial (curated by Nicolas Bourriaud), Taipei City
2016: Nostalgia for the Future: An Introspective Retrospective, Taipei Fine Arts Museum
2016: Nostalgia for the Future: An Introspective Retrospective, Chinese Centre for Contemporary Art Manchester
2016: The Imitation Game, Manchester Art Gallery
2017: Pān-toh Supra, Contemporary Art Space, Batumi Georgia
2017:  Drawing Biennial 2017, Drawing Room, London
2017: The New Observatory, FACT Liverpool
2018: Broken Symmetries, FACT Liverpool
2018: A History of Drawing, Camberwell Space London
 2019: Science Gallery London
 2019: Drawing Biennial 2019, Drawing Room, London
 2020: Invisible: There’s more to it than meets the eye, Science Gallery Dublin
 2020: National Taiwan Museum of Fine Arts
2020/21:  If there is a place I haven't been to, Liquid Love, MOCA Taipei/TheCube Project Space, Taipei
2020/21: Broken Symmetries, Kumu Art Museum, Tallin, with Julieta Aranda, Diann Baur, James Bridle, Mariele Neudecker, Suzanne Treister, Yu-Chen Wang and others.
2021: Drawing Biennial 2021, Drawing Room, London
2021: My Kid Could’ve Done That!, Edge Art Centre, University of Bath, curated by Will Cooper and his daughter, with artists Ryan Gander, Jasleen Kaur, Tessa Lynch, Laure Prouvost, Emily Speed, Yu-Chen Wang & Andro Semeiko, and their kids
2022: Yu-Chen Wang: Full Circle, Danum Gallery, Doncaster, curated by Mike Stubbs
2022: L’Œil du Cyclone, Le Lieu Unique, Nantes, with Yuan Goang-Ming, Chang Li-Ren, Huang Hai-Hsin, Yao Jui-Chung, Yu-Chen Wang, Su Hui-Yu and Wang Lien-Cheng, curated by Iris Shu Ping Huang, Patrick Gyger and Eli Commins.

Publications 

 The Song of the Machines, Yu-Chen Wang, Jennifer Thatcher, with texts by Sophia Crilly, Bob Dickinson, Rudyard Kipling, Georgia Korossi, Nicolas de Oliveira/Nicola Oxley, Chelsea Pettitt, Centre For Chinese Contemporary Art  Manchester, 2012. , .
Return from Voluntary Exile: Yu-Chen Wang Talks to White Fungus, Taipei Fine Arts Museum; National Culture and Arts Foundation, 2016.
The Imitation Game, exhibition catalogue (with artists Ed Atkins, James Capper, Paul Granjon, Tove Kjellmark, Lynn Hershman Leeson, David Link, Mari Velonaki and Yu-Chen Wang, and authors Steve Furber, Clare Gannaway, Jackie Stacey, Lucy Suchman), Manchester Art Gallery, 2016.
New Life and the Dream Garden, with essay by JJ Charlesworth, Leeds, Basement Arts Project, 2017
 Quantum - In search of the invisible, CCCB and Direcció de Comunicació de la Diputació de Barcelona, 2019. , (català, castellano, English)
 Emotionarama, Andrew Hunt and Andro Semeiko (eds.), with contributions by Polly Apfelbaum, Fiona Bannerer, Kerstin Brätsch, Liu Ding, Andy Holden, Mike Nelson, Alicia Paz, Lindsay Seers, Amy Sillman, Mark Titchner, Tris Vonna-Michell, Yu-Chen Wang, and many more, Slimvolume, 2020. .
Drawing Biennial 2021, catalogue, Drawing Room Publications, London 2021

References

External links 
Website of Yu-Chen Wang
Interview with Yu-Chen Wang on Interalia Magazine
Yu-Chen Wang on vimeo

Living people
1978 births
British women artists
Alumni of Goldsmiths, University of London
Alumni of Chelsea College of Arts
Taiwanese contemporary artists
Taiwanese artists
British artists
Artists from London